Quantic and his Combo Bárbaro is a project of musician and DJ Will Holland. Holland has recorded under several names, most notably Quantic.

Members

Current members
 Alfredito Linares (piano)
 Ángel Hernández (bugle, trumpet)
 Esteban Copete (percussion, saxophone)
 Fernando Silva (bass)
 Freddy Colorado (percussion)
 João Comanche Gomes (percussion)
 Lucho Blanco (saxophone)
 Malcolm Catto (drums)
 Will Holland (electric guitar , accordion and more )

Vocals
 Falu Shah – Albela
 Kabir Malik Green – I Just Fell in Love Again, Linda Morena, Who Knows
 Nidia Góngora – Un Canto A Mi Tierra

Discography

Albums
 Tradition in Transition (Tru Thoughts, 2009)

Singles
 Linda Morena/Enyere Kumbara (7", Tru Thoughts, 2009)
 Un Canto a Mi Tierra (12", Tru Thoughts, 2010)

References

External links
Quantic and his Combo Bárbaro at www.quantic.org

Colombian musical groups